Wilhelm Germann (3 April 1840, in Gardelegen – 7 February 1902, in Meiningen) was a German Protestant theologian and missionary.

He studied theology in Erlangen and in 1864 became a member of the Lutheran Leipzig Mission. In 1865 he was ordained as a minister, and later the same year, began work as a missionary in Madras, India. In 1867 he returned to Germany, and subsequently served as a minister in Meiningen. In 1886, he was named a church councilor and superintendent in Wasungen. In 1894 he was awarded with an honorary degree by the Faculty of Theology at Leipzig.

Published works 
He is best known as the author of biographies, especially works involving missionaries to India, such as Johann Phillip Fabricius (1865), Bartholomäus Ziegenbalg and Heinrich Plütschau (1868) and Christian Friedrich Schwarz (1870).
 Johann Philipp Fabricius : seine fünfzigjährige Wirksamkeit im Tamulenlande und das Missionsleben des achtzehten Jahrhunderts daheim und draussen, 1865 – Johann Philipp Fabricius: his fifty years of activity in Tamilakam, etc.
 Ziegenbalg und Plütschau : die Gründungsjahre der Trankebarschen Mission; ein Beitrag zur Geschichte des Pietismus nach handschriftlichen Quellen und ältesten Drucken, 1868 – Ziegenbalg and Plütschau: the founding years of the Tranquebar Mission; a contribution to the history of Pietism, etc. 
 Missionar Christian Friedrich Schwartz : sein Leben und Wirken aus Briefen des Halleschen Missionsarchivs, 1870 – Christian Friedrich Schwarz: his life and work from letters of the Halle Mission archive.
 Die Kirche der Thomaschristen : ein Beitrag zur Geschichte der orientalischen Kirchen, 1877 – The Church of the Saint Thomas Christians: a contribution to the history of the eastern churches.
 Heinrich Melchior Mühlenberg : Patriarch der Lutherischen kirche Nordamerika's : Selbstbiographie, 1711–1743, (as editor, 1881) – Heinrich Melchior Muhlenberg; patriarch of the Lutheran Church of North America: self-biography.
 D. Johann Forster, der Hennebergische Reformator, ein Mitarbeiter und Mitstreiter D. Martin Luthers, 1894 – Johann Forster, the Henneberg reformer, an associate and collaborator of Martin Luther.
 M. Christian Juncker und sein hennebergisches Geschichtswerk : eine Untersuchung : zum Säkular-Geburtstage Georg Brückners, 1900 – Christian Juncker and his Henneberg historical work, etc.
In the Allgemeine Deutsche Biographie, he was the author of biographies on Bernhard II, Duke of Saxe-Meiningen, Georg Brückner and Wilhelm I of Henneberg-Schleusingen.

References 

1840 births
1902 deaths
People from Gardelegen
People from the Province of Saxony
19th-century German Protestant theologians
German Protestant missionaries
German biographers
German expatriates in India